The 2010 Waveney District Council election took place on 6 May 2003 to elect members of Waveney District Council in England. This was on the same day as other local elections.

Summary

Ward results

References

2010 English local elections
May 2010 events in the United Kingdom
2010
2010s in Suffolk